HU-308 (also known as onternabez, HU308, PPP-003 and ARDS-003) is a cannabidiol (CBD)-derivative drug  that acts as a potent cannabinoid agonist. It is highly selective for the cannabinoid-2 receptor (CB2 receptor) subtype, with a selectivity more than 5,000 times greater for the CB2 receptor than the CB1 receptor. The synthesis and characterization of HU-308 took place in the laboratory of Raphael Mechoulam at the Hebrew University of Jerusalem (the HU in HU-308) in the late 1990s. The pinene dimethoxy-DMH-CBD derivative HU-308 was identified as a potent peripheral CB2-selective agonist in in vitro and animal studies in 1990 and 1999.

Legal status
Tetra Bio-Pharma owns the intellectual property rights to HU-308. 

HU-308 is non-psychoactive and not scheduled at the federal level in the United States. It is a Schedule I controlled substance in the state of Florida making it illegal to buy, sell, or possess there.

References

See also 
 HU-210
 HU-320

Primary alcohols
Phenol ethers
HU cannabinoids
Designer drugs
CB2 receptor agonists